= Games for Heroes =

Non-profit organization

Games For Heroes is a non-profit organization that sends hand-held video games to United States troops currently serving in Iraq and Afghanistan.

== History ==
In March 2008, Games for Heroes founders Peter Gallagher and Jack Wilson organized a community service project called Cheer up the Troops. For one week, Peter and Jack, then 15, helped elementary school children write over 1,000 letters and drawings to send to US troops stationed overseas. This project inspired them to put video game collection boxes in their school, fire stations, and churches in their Westchester County, New York neighborhood.

In addition to video game systems, the organization also actively collects games for systems and batteries. As of mid-2010, the organization has distributed more than $100,000 in goods.

== Awards ==
- American Red Cross Good Samaritan Heroes Award - May 21, 2009
- Reader's Digest Make It Matter Award - July 2009
